Hardik Patel (born 8 May 1995) is an Indian cricketer who plays for Gujarat.

References

External links
 

1995 births
Living people
Indian cricketers
Gujarat cricketers
People from Surat